Tormis Laine (born 6 August 2000) is an Estonian alpine skier. He represented Estonia at the 2018 Winter Olympics. He represented Estonia at the 2022 Winter Olympics.

References

2000 births
Living people
Estonian male alpine skiers
Olympic alpine skiers of Estonia
Alpine skiers at the 2018 Winter Olympics
Alpine skiers at the 2022 Winter Olympics
Competitors at the 2023 Winter World University Games